Francesco D'Onofrio (born 3 August 1939) is an Italian politician and academic, former Minister of Public Education in the Berlusconi I Cabinet.

Biography 
D'Onofrio graduated in Law at the University of Naples Federico II and achieved a Master in Law at the Harvard University under the guidance of Henry Kissinger, teaching a few years later Public Law at the Sapienza University of Rome.

In 1982, D'Onofrio joined the Christian Democracy, with which he has been elected to the Senate in 1983 and to the Chamber of Deputies in 1987 (he entered in Parliament only in 1990, replacing his colleague Giovanni Galloni who was elected to the CSM) and in 1992.

From 12 April 1991 to 24 April 1992, he joined the Andreotti VII Cabinet as undersecretary at the Ministry for Constitutional Reforms and at the Ministry for Regional Affairs.

In 1994, he joined Pier Ferdinando Casini's Christian Democratic Centre, allied with Silvio Berlusconi's Forza Italia, and is re-elected one more time to the Chamber of Deputies. In May 1994, D'Onofrio is appointed Minister of Public Education in the Berlusconi I Cabinet.

He is later re-elected to the Senate in 1996, in 2001 and in 2006. From 1996 to 2001, D'Onofrio has been the group leader in Palazzo Madama of the Christian Democratic Centre, while from 2006 to 2008 he has been the group leader of the Union of the Centre. He decided not to run again for a seat in Parliament in 2008.

He is currently a columnist of the online newspaper Formiche.net.

References

External links 
Files about his parliamentary activities (in Italian): IX, X, XI, XII, XIII, XIV, XV legislature

1939 births
Living people
Christian Democracy (Italy) politicians
Christian Democratic Centre politicians
Union of the Centre (2002) politicians
Government ministers of Italy
Education ministers of Italy
20th-century Italian politicians
21st-century Italian politicians
Academic staff of the University of Naples Federico II
Harvard Law School alumni
Academic staff of the Sapienza University of Rome